Philodendron gloriosum is a species of plant in the family Araceae, genus Philodendron. It is a crawling, terrestrial plant, native to Colombia whose foliage is characterized by a cordate (heart-shaped) and velutinous surface, pink margins, and pale green, white, or pinkish veins.

References

gloriosum
Flora of Colombia
Plants described in 1876
Taxa named by Édouard André